Motipur may refer to:

Motipur, Muzaffarpur
Motipur, Punjab
Motipur, Nepal
Motipur, Janakpur -Nepal
Motipur, Kapilvastu -Nepal
Motipur, Morang - Nepal
Motipur, Rupandehi -Nepal